The North Carolina Solar Center is a resource center for sustainable energy programs located at North Carolina State University in Raleigh, North Carolina. When it was created in 1988, the center's focus was solar energy. The N.C. Solar Center now serves as a resource for innovative clean energy technologies through demonstration, technical assistance, outreach, and training. It also administers the Database of Encouragement for Renewables & Efficiency (DSIRE), a resource providing financial encouragement and policies in the energy industry.

Program Areas

Clean Transportation Program

The goal of NCSC’s Clean Transportation Program is to increase the use of alternative fuels and advanced transportation technologies by working with the government, non-profits, and businesses. The Clean Transportation team is helping to support cleaner, more vibrant local and state economies and greater energy security for the state while cleaning up North Carolina’s air. The Clean Transportation Program specifically promotes the expanded use of fuels such as biodiesel, electricity, ethanol, natural gas, and propane, as well as advanced transportation technologies such as diesel retrofits and idle reduction equipment that reduce emissions and fuel consumption.

In the past, the Clean Transportation Program has supported a multitude of alternative fuel, idling reduction, and hybrid vehicle projects through the Clean Fuel Advanced Technology project. This 6-year project to cut emissions in 24 counties is funded by the North Carolina Department of Transportation. From 2006-2009, N.C. Solar Center helped appropriate $2.1 million in funding that purchased 19 refueling stations, 24 hybrid electric vehicles, 58 alternative fuel vehicles, 72 diesel retrofits, and 24 electrified truck stop parking spaces.

In addition, the Clean Transportation Program joined the Carolina Blue Skies and Green Jobs initiative in 2010, which is a $12 million effort in the Triangle to boost alternative fuel infrastructure by 30% through a fuel-neutral approach. Partnering with the Triangle J Council of Governments, N.C. Solar Center worked to implement over 50 sub-award projects with ARRA money that have created 63 ethanol, biodiesel, and natural gas fueling stations, 112 electric vehicle charging stations, and 80 alternative fuel vehicles.

Recently, the Clean Transportation team joined an initiative led by the Centralina Council of Governments to create a state roadmap toward electric vehicle adoption. N.C. Solar Center chairs the Incentives working group to offer recommendations about the ways that North Carolina can align policy incentives to prepare for rapid integration of plug-in electric vehicles into the N.C. market.

Green Building

The goal of the Green Building program area is to provide early-stage green design assistance for commercial, institutional, and residential projects. The center's programs assist in determining site orientation, insulation, natural lighting, and durable construction materials. Staff members working in the Green Building program provide technical assistance, education, and support to the building industry to build energy, water, and resource efficient and healthy commercial, institutional and residential buildings.

N.C. Solar Center developed and currently administers N.C. Healthy Built Homes Program that certifies homes with a checklist of the most up-to-date practices in the rapidly emerging field of green building. The Healthy Built Homes Program targets homebuilders and energy raters by providing resources and education in order to create a sound quality assurance process for North Carolina’s green workforce. As of June 2009, N.C. Healthy Built Homes had 139 builders participating in the program and 695 houses verified or under construction.

In February 2008, N.C. Solar Center was chosen by the US Green Building Council through a competitive process to be a LEED for Homes provider. LEED homes are homes that use less energy, water, and waste, and they are healthier and more affordable for occupants. As of January 2009, there were 140 homes certified or under construction in North Carolina that used the Solar Center as their provider.

Clean Power & Efficiency

The goal of the Clean Power & Efficiency program area is to apply industrial efficiency techniques to allow communities, universities, and manufacturing centers to realize sizable savings in energy costs. The Clean Power / Efficiency program conducts energy efficiency assessments for organizations. The program specializes in consulting with organizations to select the optimal efficiency technologies from the market for the intended use. Some of these technologies include:

 Boilers and steam systems
 Compressed air energy storage
 Energy intensive processes
 Fuel and feedstock flexibility
 Motors, fans, and pumps
 Process heating
 Energy management and automation

The N.C. Solar Center specializes in assessing the feasibility of combined heat and power (CHP) systems, waste heat recovery systems, and district energy projects. Previous projects include a 5 MW CHP and cogeneration plant installation at Fort Bragg, an 11 MW, two-turbine CHP installation at N.C. State, and an 850-kW biomass-fueled CHP installation in Lewiston.

The Clean Power & Efficiency program also heads the Southeast regions of DOE’s Regional Clean Energy Application Centers (CEAC) program. The N.C. Solar Center analyzes the market potential for CHP systems in diverse sectors. The Center also coordinates education and outreach about the benefits and applications of CHP, district energy, and waste heat recovery systems to policymakers and energy users. The N.C. Solar Center also provides thermal generation technical assistance for 180 sites in the Southeast.

Renewable Energy

The Renewable Energy program area provides technical assistance to N.C. stakeholders in solar, biomass, geothermal, and wind technologies.

The N.C. Solar Center also completes single day feasibility assessments for governmental, commercial and industrial sites around the state to explore how they can integrate renewable energy into their existing energy systems. The Center has played a major role in several large renewable energy installations in the state, including SunEnergy1’s 2.4MW installation in Plymouth, a 20-kW hybrid wind-solar PV system operated in Smyrna, a 2.5-kW wind turbine in Coquina Beach, SAS’s 2.2 MW solar PV installation in Cary, and the Outer Banks Brewing Station’s 10 kW wind turbine in Kill Devil Hills, NC.

Since 1995, the N.C. Solar Center has provided performance testing solar thermal and solar photovoltaic technologies to be standardized for the market. The N.C. Solar Center opened a new facility in 2012 to performance test flat-plate and evacuated tube solar thermal collectors for SRCC OG-100 certification.

Economic Development

The Economic Development program is very active in the commercial landscape of North Carolina’s clean technology sector. The program coordinates clean tech industrial recruitment support and advising by connecting out-of-state businesses with the resources that North Carolina has to help them get started. The Center works with 300 businesses on industry development projects annually.

The Economic Development program also coordinates with the Renewable Energy program to provide solar and clean energy financial modeling for businesses looking for economic returns on renewable energy projects. The N.C. Solar Center’s dashboard allows customers to model inputs including ownership structures, tax incentives, grants, depreciation, electricity prices, and project costs.

The N.C. Solar Center has had a large impact on North Carolina’s clean tech landscape. In 2012, the organization worked with the N.C. Department of Commerce to bring China’s Ming Yang Wind Power Group, a leading wind turbine manufacturer, to N.C. State University through a research and development center on Centennial Campus.

Workforce Development

The Workforce Development program area works to educate North Carolina’s work force on assessing and installing clean technologies.

The Renewable Energy Technology Diploma series (RET) is a week-long certification course for non-degree professionals. In this series, participants get an in-depth understanding of a survey of renewable technologies as well as green building principles and strategies. The classes also offer hands-on training, current policy information, and a network of energy professionals. These courses offer continuing education credits for NC electrical contractors, registered architects, professional engineers, and LEED accredited professionals. The Workforce Development program also offers short course versions of these professional development workshops that last three days or less.

The Workforce Development team also travels around the state to deliver these workshops. Since 2006, the team has traveled around North Carolina to deliver 5-day workshops, including Fayetteville for a photovoltaics course, Asheville for a solar and radiant heating course, Wilmington for a green building course, and Manteo for a wind power course.

In addition, the Workforce Development program offers the Certificate in Renewable Energy Management (CREM) course designed for business professionals and students studying to be in the clean technology sector. The course provides a sound foundation of how existing renewable technologies work but also dives into the infrastructure, finance, and policies surrounding the renewable energy industry.

Energy Policy

The N.C. Solar Center’s Energy Policy program conducts research and analysis to provide a better understanding of how renewables and energy efficiency are best promoted through public policy.

In 1995, the N.C. Solar Center launched the Database of State Incentives for Renewables and Efficiency (DSIRE). The database is the most comprehensive source for energy efficiency and renewable energy financial incentives and policies in the country. The website features interactive maps and search features to allow visitors to pinpoint the exact local, state, or national policy information they want to know. The website experiences over 175,000 unique users/month. The DSIRE team also sends out monthly news blasts to keep policymakers and industry leaders up to date.

The Energy Policy program also participates in the Sunshot Solar Outreach Partnership to remove solar market barriers and encourage the development of a sustainable solar infrastructure. The partners share best practices for increasing the use of solar energy in and by communities throughout the U.S. The N.C. Solar Center conducts outreach to local governments around the country to help them generate a master plan for solar energy deployment. Through encouraging local governments to develop regulations, incentives, and development agreements, the N.C. Solar Center and its partners are working to enable solar-generated power to account for 15-18% of America’s electricity generation by 2030.

Education & Outreach

The Education & Outreach program coordinates several clean technology activities for K-12 audiences in North Carolina. The purpose is to generate enthusiasm for STEM at a crucial stage in the educational development of students and to encourage students to consider technical careers at an early age.

For high schoolers, the N.C. Solar Center runs the Students Making Advancements in Renewable Transportation Technologies (SMARTT) program that provides them a cooperative, hands-on learning experience building a street-legal electric vehicle. For middle schools, the program runs the nationwide Junior Solar Sprint in the fall that challenges young students to learn about solar technologies and build solar cars. and the N.C. Sustainable Building Design Competition in order to give students at all levels firsthand experience working with green technologies. The N.C. Solar Center has also designed a wind energy workshop for teachers that want to integrate wind energy and building wind turbines into a course.

Education is integrated into every individual program area at the N.C. Solar Center. As a whole, the Center provides fact sheets and resource guides for policymakers, businesses, and educators through its website. The N.C. Solar Center launched a campaign in 2012 to promote clean technology news and benefits to the general public through social media.

NCSU Solar House 

The N.C. Solar Center also manages the NCSU Solar House, is an educational and demonstration showcase for solar technologies. The building features green building techniques, a wind turbine, biodiesel production, and EV charging stations. Over the last two decades, more than 250,000 people from around the world have toured the facility and learned about the possibilities of renewable energy, clean transportation, and efficient design. Beyond the educational value of the Solar House, the building is also a living laboratory for renewable energy research.

See also
Arizona Solar Center
Florida Solar Energy Center

References

External links 
 North Carolina Solar Center website 
 Database of State Incentives for Renewables and Efficiency (DSIRE)
 Interstate Renewable Energy Council

Renewable energy organizations based in the United States